Morlon O'Neil Greenwood (born July 17, 1978) is a former American football linebacker.

Early years
Greenwood attended Freeport High School and participated in both football and wrestling. At first, he was a wrestling athlete who had won the Empire State Games in the freestyle division as a sophomore and as a junior as well as the Greco-Roman division as a junior. An assistant wrestling coach Russ Cellan (who was also the head football coach) then convinced him to play football as a junior. As a senior, in football, he was an All-County and an All-State pick, while he won the state wrestling title in the 215 lb. class.

College career
Greenwood played collegiate at Syracuse University where he started 48 consecutive games at linebacker. As a red shirt freshman, he recorded 64 tackles and two quarterback sacks while being named to the Freshman All-American second-team choice by The Sporting News. During his sophomore year, he made 55 tackles and 3 sacks. As a junior for the Orange, Greenwood collected 91 tackles along with one sack, which was against Michigan quarterback Tom Brady. Being named co-captain his senior year, he had a career high 98 tackles while being named to the 2000 All Big East First-team along with teammates Dwight Freeney and. He graduated from Syracuse with a bachelor's degree in Health and Exercise Science.

Professional career
Greenwood was selected in the 2001 NFL Draft by the Miami Dolphins. He played four years with Miami including a 2004 season in which he recorded 108 tackles for the Dolphins. In 2005, as a free agent, he signed a five-year contract with the Houston Texans which was worth $22.5 million and featured a $7 million signing bonus. His career with the Texans was highlighted by a 2007 season where he posted 118 tackles. In 2009, he had a brief period with the Oakland Raiders. Morlon Greenwood, a graduate of Freeport High School, was inducted in the inaugural Nassau County High School Athletics Hall of Fame. The class of 6 included notable athletes from Nassau County on Long Island such as Jay Fiedler of the Miami Dolphins and fellow Syracuse alum and NFL Hall of famer Jim Brown. The induction ceremony took on September 30, 2015 in Long Island NY.

Player profile
Greenwood was known mainly for his superb level of strength and conditioning. During his pro day at Syracuse, he posted a 4.47 40 yard dash time, a 415-pound bench press, a 685-pound squat, and a 350-pound power clean. In addition, he was named a 2002 National Strength Coaches Association All American. He was also known for his awareness on the field, having 4 straight NFL seasons of over 100 tackles.

References

External links
just Sports Stats

1978 births
Living people
Sportspeople from Kingston, Jamaica
Sportspeople from Nassau County, New York
People from Freeport, New York
Jamaican emigrants to the United States
Jamaican players of American football
American football linebackers
Syracuse Orange football players
Miami Dolphins players
Houston Texans players
Oakland Raiders players
Omaha Nighthawks players